William P. Fralic Jr. (October 31, 1962 – December 13, 2018) was an American professional football player who was a guard for the Atlanta Falcons and Detroit Lions of the National Football League (NFL) from 1985 to 1993.  He played college football for the Pittsburgh Panthers.

Early years
Born in Penn Hills, Pennsylvania, Fralic played high school football at Penn Hills High School and graduated in 1981.  Readers of the Pennsylvania Football News named him to the "All Century" team of Pennsylvania high school football players.  He is listed beside Chuck Bednarik and Mike Munchak as a first-team offensive lineman. Fralic was named the male high school athlete of the year by the Pittsburgh Post-Gazette.

College
After high school, the highly recruited Fralic attended the University of Pittsburgh on a football scholarship.  While at Pitt, he played offensive tackle for the Panthers and was named a consensus All-American his junior and senior seasons. He was known for the 'Pancake Block' which was termed for the way he would flatten his opponents when blocking.  Fralic's teammates at Pitt included future Pro Bowl tackle Jimbo Covert and future Hall of Fame quarterback Dan Marino.

NFL career
In the 1985 NFL Draft, Fralic was selected by the Atlanta Falcons with the second overall pick. He became a starter for the Falcons at offensive guard during his rookie season. Fralic went on to be named All-Pro in 1986 and 1987, and was named to the Pro Bowl from 1986 to 1989.

At the end of his NFL career, Fralic was one of the first players to take advantage of the new free agent system and jumped from the Falcons to the Detroit Lions, almost doubling his pay to $1.6 million for the 1993 season. The 1989 action figure of Fralic, from the Starting Lineup Kenner toy line, is the 'Holy Grail' for collectors. As of 2020, a loose figure (not in the package) can fetch as much as $900 US dollars. The trading card that came with the figure is worth $200-$300.

Professional wrestling and color commentary
In 1986, Fralic was one of six football players in the twenty-man battle royal at WrestleMania 2, in which Andre the Giant was the victor.

Fralic was a color commentator for Falcons radio broadcasts from 1995 to 1997, and commentated Pittsburgh Panther broadcasts from 2004 to 2010.

Personal life and death
Fralic died at the age of 56 on December 13, 2018 from cancer.

During his NFL career, Fralic publicly opposed the use of steroids by NFL players and advocated more rigorous and more random testing to detect steroid use.  In May 1989, he testified before the U.S. Senate that steroid use in the NFL was rampant.  The chairman of the Senate Judiciary Committee at the time, Sen. Joe Biden of Delaware, was said to have found Fralic's testimony "refreshing and believable."

In Atlanta, Fralic ran Bill Fralic Insurance Services, which he began during his playing days with the Falcons in 1989.

Fralic had an unusual provision in his first contract with the Falcons that guaranteed that the team would pay him $150,000 per year for 40 years, even after he was no longer with the Falcons and his playing career was over. This provision came about because Fralic's father, Bill Fralic Sr., insisted that his son have security in his contract.

References

External links
The Pennsylvania Football News All-Century Team Retrieved 2009-05-01.
 'We Can Clean It Up' Atlanta Falcon Bill Fralic is making it his business to rid the NFL of steroids Retrieved 2009-05-01.
Perils Of A New Era Retrieved 2009-05-01.
Fralic not surprised by recent allegations Retrieved 2009-05-01.

1962 births
2018 deaths
All-American college football players
American football offensive guards
Atlanta Falcons announcers
Atlanta Falcons players
College football announcers
College Football Hall of Fame inductees
Detroit Lions players
National Conference Pro Bowl players
National Football League announcers
Sportspeople from Pittsburgh
People from Allegheny County, Pennsylvania
Pittsburgh Panthers football players
Players of American football from Pittsburgh